Erwin Sparendam (14 November 1934 – 20 September 2014) was a Surinamese professional footballer who played as a right back.

Career
Sparendam moved from Robinhood to Dutch club USV Elinkwijk in January 1957. He was one of five Surinamese players to join the club at that time, the others being Humphrey Mijnals, Frank Mijnals, Michel Kruin, and Charley Marbach. The group was known as the 'Five Elements' and 'The Five-Leaf Clover' and were among the first Surinamese footballers to play in the Netherlands. Sparendam stated he was not subjected to racism during his playing days, though he did experienced racism in the Netherlands as he grew older. Sparendam also played for Blauw-Wit.

He appeared for Suriname in a friendly match versus the Netherlands in 1960.

After retiring as a player Sparendam became a coach, and managed a number of amateur club sides including Eminent Boys, Faja Lobi and DVSA.

References

1934 births
2014 deaths
Surinamese footballers
Surinamese expatriate footballers
Suriname international footballers
Surinamese expatriate sportspeople in the Netherlands
Expatriate footballers in the Netherlands
USV Elinkwijk players
Blauw-Wit Amsterdam players
Eredivisie players
S.V. Robinhood players
SVB Eerste Divisie players
Association football fullbacks
Sportspeople from Paramaribo